Wet cleaning refers to methods of professional cleaning that, in contrast to traditional dry cleaning, avoids the use of chemical solvents, the most common of which is tetrachloroethylene (commonly called perchloroethylene or "perc"). Environmental groups and the United States Environmental Protection Agency have indicated that such alternative "wet cleaning" methods are better for the environment than perc, and proponents of wet cleaning state that these methods can be used without shrinking or otherwise damaging garments that typically require dry cleaning.

Computer-controlled wet cleaning machines, special dryers, safe detergents and non-toxic spot removers make wet cleaning an environmentally sound method. Wet cleaning machines have controls  that allow them to safely and efficiently clean a wide variety of garments in water. Detergents and spot removers are made of ingredients that are safer for workers and the environment, yet are as safe and effective at removing soils, stains and odors as dry cleaning solvents. Equipment, detergents and skill all contribute to successful wet cleaning. 

According to the Environmental Protection Agency (EPA), wet cleaning is the most environmentally sensitive professional method of garment cleaning. It does not use hazardous chemicals,  it does not generate hazardous waste, nor does the process create air pollution and it reduces the potential for water and soil contamination. The specialized detergents and conditioner used in the wet clean process are milder than home laundry products. All of the products are disposed of down the drain and easily handled by the local waste water treatment facility.  For professional cleaners, wet-cleaning is argued to offer several advantages, such as lowered costs for start-up capital, supplies, equipment and hazardous waste disposal, as well as less reliance on skilled labor.  

From American Dry Cleaner, "74.7% of dry cleaners use wet cleaning when cleaning casual clothing and sportswear; specialty items, like draperies and gowns (42.3%); “business casual” or softly tailored clothing (38%); restoration work (25.4%); and tailored workwear (16.9%). 
Some clothing manufacturers may mislabel their clothing "Dry Clean Only", even though there is no "reasonable basis"  for making the claim that the garment will be harmed if it is not dry cleaned.

See also
 List of laundry topics
 Dry cleaning

References

External links
 US EPA, garment and textile care publications

Cleaning methods
Laundry